Utahite is an extremely rare secondary copper zinc tellurate mineral found as a product of oxidation. Its chemical formula is Cu5Zn3(Te6+O4)4(OH)8•7H2O. 

It was first described in 1997 for an occurrence in the Centennial Eureka mine, one mile southeast of Eureka, Tintic District, Juab County, Utah, US (type locality). The discovery site was a mine dump of a hydrothermal ore deposit where it occurs with cesbronite and quartz. It has also been reported from the Empire Mine in the Tombstone District of Cochise County, Arizona.

References 

Copper(II) minerals
Zinc minerals
Tellurate and selenate minerals
Triclinic minerals
Minerals described in 1997